Wolfblood is a fantasy teen drama television series targeted at a young audience. Created by Debbie Moon, it is a co-production between CBBC and ZDF/ZDFE. The television series revolves around the life of the species known as wolfbloods. They are creatures that have enhanced senses and look like humans but can turn into wolves at will — reminiscent of werewolves — but can also control their transformation during the day as well. They are distinct from werewolves but just like werewolves, their transformation is uncontrolled during a full moon, and they are at their weakest during "the dark of the moon", at a new moon. The television series focuses on their daily life and the challenges that they face to hide their secret. Each series has new characters and concepts.

The television series has won the Royal Television Society Award for the Children's Drama category in 2013. It also won the Banff Rockie Award in the category for 'Best Children's Programme (fiction)' in the same year. In 2015 the television series won the British Screenwriters' Award in the category 'Best British Children's Television'.

Cast

Main
 Aimee Kelly (series 1–2) as Madeline "Maddy" Smith
 Bobby Lockwood (series 1–3) as Rhydian Morris
 Kedar Williams-Stirling (series 1–3) as Thomas “Tom” Okanawe
 Louisa Connolly-Burnham (series 1–3) as Shannon Kelly
 Gabrielle Green (series 1–5) as Katrina McKenzie
 Leona Vaughan (2–5) as Jana
 Louis Payne (series 4–5) as Terrence "TJ" Cipriani
 Jack Brett Anderson (series 4–5) as Matei Covaci
 Sydney Wade (series 4–5) as Emilia Covaci
 Michelle Gayle (series 4–5) as Imara Cipriani
 Rukku Nahar (series 4–5) as Selina Khan

Recurring
 Shorelle Hepkin (series 1–4) as Kay Lawrence
 Rachel Teate (series 1–4) as Kara Waterman
 Jonathan Raggett (series 1–3) as Jimi Chen
 Niek Versteeg (series 1–3, Wolfblood Secrets) as Liam Hunter
 Nahom Kassa (series 1–3) as Sam
 Mark Fleischmann (series 1–5, Wolfblood Secrets) as Mr. Jeffries
 Marcus Garvey (series 1–2) as Daniel "Dan" Smith
 Angela Lonsdale (series 1–2) as Emma Smith
 Ursula Holden-Gill (series 1–3) as Miss Fitzgerald
 Siwan Morris (series 1–3, Wolfblood Secrets) as Ceri
 Alun Raglan (series 2–4) as Alric
 Lisa Marged (series 2–4) as Meinir
 Cerith Flinn (recurring: series 2–4, guest: series 5) as Aran
 Effie Woods (series 2) and Letty Butler (series 3–5, Wolfblood Secrets) as Rebecca Whitewood
 Dean Bone (series 2–3) as Harry Averwood
 Richard Harrington (series 3) as Gerwyn
 Mandeep Dhillon (series 3) as Dacia Turner
 Jacqueline Boatswain (series 3–4) as Victoria Sweeney
 Shaun Dooley (series 3) as Alexander "Alex" Kincaid
 Natasha Goulden (series 4–5) as Robyn
 Chloe Hesar (series 4) as Carrie
 Fraser James (series 4–5) as Madoc
 Rod Glenn (series 4-5) as Warrior Wolfblood
 Andrew Scarborough (series 5) as Joshua Hartington
 Laura Greenwood (series 5) as Hafren
 Ruby Barker (series 5) as Daisie

Occasional
 Sam Fender (series 1, episode six) as Dean

Plot 
 Series 1 deals with Maddy Smith and Rhydian Morris trying to balance their lives as wolfbloods with their human sides, while trying to keep their secret from being exposed. The start of the show sees Maddy, who lives with her wolfblood family in Stoneybridge, Northumbria, coming ever closer to her first transformation. When new boy Rhydian arrives at Bradlington High School, Maddy recognises him as being a wolfblood too. Rhydian, who lives with his foster family, has only recently started changing into a wolf, having been unaware of wolfbloods prior to his move to Stoneybridge. The Smith family claim him as a distant cousin, and help him settle in and learn about the wolfblood way of life. Rhydian becomes friends with Maddy's best friends Tom and Shannon, who are unaware of Maddy's and Rhydian's secret. As the series ends Tom and Shannon finally learn the truth.
 A webisode titled The Scape Goat takes place between the first and second series. Jana, daughter of wild wolfblood pack leader Alric, persuades Rhydian to take her to a town so that she can experience the human world. Upon their return to the forest they are discovered and Alric, already disgusted by Rhydian's failure on his first hunt, sentences him to be tied to a rock without food or water for a fortnight. Sensing that Alric is bent upon Rhydian's destruction come what may, Rhydian's biological mother, Ceri, secretly helps him to escape.
 Series 2 is set three months after the series 1 finale. Jana arrives in Stoneybridge, claiming to have been exiled from the wild wolfblood pack. Despite occasional conflicts with Maddy, she befriends Maddy, Rhydian, Tom and Shannon and falls in love with the human world. Eventually she leaves to become the new wild wolfblood pack leader, her father having been exiled. It is discovered that Shannon is spying on the Smiths and collecting information on werewolves. When Maddy is almost killed as a result, she decides to destroy all of the data she has gathered. Liam, a boy at their school, then also begins investigating werewolves. Suspicious of the Smith family, he steals a dog chew from which Dr. Whitewood is able to extract and analyse a sample of the DNA of Maddy's father. With the results proving that the Smiths are not human they are forced to leave the country and, with the help of a contact, go to Canada. At the series' conclusion Maddy says goodbye to her friends and confesses her love for Rhydian.
 Between series 2 and series 3 seven webisodes known as Jana Bites take place. They tell the story of Jana's adventures as pack leader of the wild wolfbloods, and end with her being shot and injured while trying to lead hunters away from the pack. This leads to her reappearance in series 3.
 Series 3 is set two months after Maddy and her family leave Stoneybridge. Rhydian is heartbroken after Maddy's departure. Jana returns from the wild wolfblood pack in dire need of help, bringing with her new allies. Together with his friends, Tom, Shannon and Jana, Rhydian attempts to focus on life beyond school and Stoneybridge. Rhydian meets a new wolfblood named Dacia from a biotech company called Segolia, which assists wolfbloods and helped the Smiths to leave the country. She tells him that Maddy and her parents are safe in Canada, and offers him a job with the company which is secretly run by wolfbloods and their human allies. It transpires that Segolia is researching the medical uses of wolfblood DNA. They are particularly interested in Jana and her wild pack because they have special abilities, verging on telepathy or magic, that are lost to other wolfbloods. Dr. Whitewood reappears, still desperate to find evidence of wolfbloods, but Dacia prevents her from revealing the wolfblood secret by bribing her with the offer of a job at Segolia. As the series accelerates towards a climax, Rhydian must unite the wild wolfblood pack or their species will face extinction. The series ends with Rhydian reuniting with Maddy (both in wolf form) in the snow in Canada.
 Set between series 3 and 4 is an animated motion comic on the CBBC website known as New Moon Rising. Victoria Sweeney, the head of Segolia's security, sends Jana to investigate an elderly wolfblood and his nurse, while Shannon and Tom visit Rhydian and Maddy in Canada. This comic makes a "happy ending" for Rhydian, Maddy, her family and friends, as the characters all left the show.
 Series 4 is set in a big city that Jana moves to after leaving Stoneybridge, where she joins her former classmate Katrina (who now runs her uncle's "Kafe" café) and Mr Jeffries (her ex-head teacher turned author of "Bloodwolf" young adult novels). The city is unnamed, but the Tyne Bridge in Newcastle appears in some scenes and also the new animated opening credits.

Jana meets three new wolfblood families - brother and sister Matei and Emilia from Eastern Europe, TJ and his mother Imara who are Afro-Caribbean, and Selina and her parents who are Muslims. They become the catalyst for the formation of a new pack. With the wolfblood secret looking increasingly fragile, the pressures on Jana grow, forcing her to question where she truly belongs and who she can trust. This leads to a cataclysmic decision that will change all of their lives forever.

 Set between series 4 and 5 is an animated motion comic on the CBBC website known as Hunter's Moon. 
Also between series 4 and 5 ten mini-episodes known as Wolfblood Secrets take place. It consisted of scenes set in an office run by an unnamed organisation where members of the series 4 cast were interviewed by 2 mysterious characters - Mr. Smith, and his superior, Ms. Jones - who want to know all they can about Wolfbloods. This was intercut with clips from Wolfblood episodes to illustrate what they are talking about. Jones returns as a character in series 5.

 Series 5 begins with the secret no longer a secret, and the world has changed for Jana, Matei, Selina, TJ, and Imara. Suddenly they're the most visible wolfbloods on the planet, and everyone has an opinion about what they did. Some humans are excited by the reveal of this new species – and some are hostile and scared. As tensions rise on both sides, difficult choices lie ahead.

Production
Wolfblood was created after series creator Debbie Moon, during a visit to a bookshop, saw the words "wolf" in one book title and "blood" in another and blended them together. The series was commissioned after the BBC Writersroom website announced an open call for children's drama scripts. Moon was among eight writers taken to a conference centre in Kent, and, after a few days of intensive development, it became one of two new original children's dramas to be commissioned by CBBC. The series was filmed in the north-east of England by the same crew who filmed Tracy Beaker Returns. Early series filming locations included Hookergate School and the woods of the surrounding Rowlands Gill countryside, from series 4 onwards the filming moved to at Heworth Grange Comprehensive in East Gateshead (Hawthorn Comprehensive in the series) and the areas around Windy Nook and Newcastle.

Production for series 1 began in February 2012 and ran until May 2012. It was shot in 3 production blocks: episodes 1–4, episodes 5–8, and episodes 9–13. A second series was confirmed after the final episode of the first series had aired. Filming for the second series began February 2013 and ended May 2013. All of the directors were new to the series, and it was shot in four production blocks: episodes 1–4, episodes 5–8, episode 9, and episodes 10–13. Filming for the third series began in February 2014 and ended in May 2014 and the series aired from 15 September until 27 October 2014.

Episodes

DVD
The first three series are available on DVD in the United Kingdom, United States, Australia, and Germany (the latter has also released the series in Blu-ray format). They are also available in many other countries via Amazon and other online retailers.

Awards and nominations

Spin-off
The second series was accompanied by a 10 part wildlife spin-off series exploring wolves, hosted by Bobby Lockwood. This has been produced by the BBC Natural History Unit, entitled Wolfblood Uncovered; it began airing on 9 September 2013. Wolfblood Uncovered compares scenes in Wolfblood with facts about real wolves, and points out how wolf behavior is reflected in the actions of the characters in the story, such as living in packs, defending territory against rivals, fear of fire and enclosed spaces, reliance on sense of smell and a carnivorous diet.

See also
 Naagin
 H2O: Just Add Water
 Mako: Island of Secrets

References

External links
 
 

2010s British children's television series
2010s British teen television series
2012 British television series debuts
2017 British television series endings
BBC children's television shows
British fantasy television series
Disney Channel original programming
English-language television shows
Television about werewolves